Eczacıbaşı SK men's basketball team (English: Eczacıbaşı Sports Club), commonly known as Eczacıbaşı, was the professional basketball department of Eczacıbaşı SK, a sports club based in Istanbul, Turkey. The team competed in the Turkish Basketball Super League.

History
The men's basketball team of Eczacıbaşı SK was established in 1968 as the basketball section of the Turkish industrial group of companies Eczacıbaşı Holding, and began to compete in the lower Turkish basketball divisions. The club soon became one of the most successful teams in Turkey, having won two times the 2. Turkish Basketball League (1974, 1991) and most importantly eight times the Turkish Basketball Super League afterwards. Eczacıbaşı also won the Presidential Cup in 1988 against Fenerbahçe.

At the start of the 1992-93 season the board of Eczacıbaşı SK took the decision that ended their basketball department activities on 3 August 1992 (1992 because of falling for the second time), and the team was disbanded by announcing its withdrawal from the league.

Honours
 Turkish Super League
 Winners (8): 1975–76, 1976–77, 1977–78, 1979–80, 1980–81, 1981–82, 1987–88, 1988–89
 Runners-up (1): 1978–79
 Turkish Presidential Cup
 Winners (1): 1988
 Runners-up (1): 1989
 Turkish League 2
 Winners (2):1973–74, 1990–91

Head coaches
  Aydan Siyavuş: (1975-83)

References

External links
TBLStat.net Team Profile

Turkish Basketball Super League teams
Defunct basketball teams in Turkey
Basketball teams established in 1968
Sports clubs disestablished in 1992